Ebenezer Strict Baptist Chapel is a place of worship, dating from 1897,  on Jocelyn Road in Richmond, London. Sunday services are held at 10:30 am and 6 pm.

References

1829 establishments in England
19th-century Baptist churches in the United Kingdom
19th-century churches in the United Kingdom
Baptist churches in the London Borough of Richmond upon Thames
Richmond, London
Strict Baptist chapels
Churches completed in 1829